Philippe Médard (10 June 1959 – 30 September 2017) was a French handball player who competed in the 1992 Summer Olympics. He was born in Meslay-du-Maine. In 1992 he was a member of the French handball team which won the bronze medal. He played five matches and scored two goals.

He played in France national handball team 188 times.

References

External links
 
 

1959 births
2017 deaths
French male handball players
Olympic handball players of France
Handball players at the 1992 Summer Olympics
Olympic bronze medalists for France
Olympic medalists in handball
Medalists at the 1992 Summer Olympics
Sportspeople from Mayenne